This is a list of songs written by Burt Bacharach.


Chart hits and other notable songs written by Burt Bacharach

References

External links
 discogs.com entry as composer
 Search results at bmi.com

Bacharach, Burt